Solariella marginulata is an extinct species of sea snail, a marine gastropod mollusk, in the family Solariellidae.

References

Solariellidae
Taxa named by Rodolfo Amando Philippi